The William I. Koch International Sea Scout Cup is a biannual Sailing Regatta put on by the William I. Koch International Sea Scout Cup Association, Inc. in conjunction with the  Sea Scouting (Boy Scouts of America). The event was founded by Bill Koch in 2002 in order to allow Sea Scouts from around the world to compete. The original National Sea Scout Sailing Championship began in the 1930s but went dormant when Sea Scouts left the program to serve in World War II.
Today Sea Scouts from around the world gather for a week of friendly competition. Scouts from Australia, Brazil, Denmark, Egypt, England, Finland, Germany, Ireland, Liberia, New Zealand, Norway, Poland, Saudi Arabia, South Africa, Sweden, Trinidad and Tobago, Turkey, and the United States have participated.

History
After nearly half a century since there was a Sea Scout national sailing competition, the Sea Scouts program asked Bill Koch if he would be interested in reviving the championship that had been dormant since World War II. Koch requested that the regatta be open to Scouts from around the world in order to foster international understanding and camaraderie.

The Koch Cup 

Bill Koch president of the America³ Foundation, Inc. commissioned Asprey’s of London, the silversmith who made the original America's Cup trophy, to manufacture the William I. Koch International Sea Scout Cup. The trophy referred to as The Koch Cup is made of silver and stands thirty-four inches tall. America³ Foundation, Inc. transferred the Cup to the National Scouting Museum where it is on display in the national Boy Scout Office in Irving, Texas when not on loan to the Koch Cup or the America³ Foundation, Inc.

Kiwi Cup

Teams qualify on the first few days of the cup. Sea Scouts in the top half of the fleet qualify for the Koch Fleet and the rest qualify for the Kiwi Fleet. The Kiwi Cup was donated by the Sea Scouts of New Zealand in 2000. It is an authentic Maori carved statue that is presented to the winners of the Kiwi Fleet.

Results

References 

Sailing competitions in the United States
Sea Scouting